Kassai may refer to:
Kassai (surname)
Kassai and Luk, a children's television series
Apostolic Prefecture of Upper Kassai, a mission territory in Central Africa
 Kessai Note, president of the Marshall Islands
 Kasai River, a tributary of the Congo River in central Africa

See also
Kasai (disambiguation)